David Robert Malpass (born March 8, 1956) is an American economic analyst and former government official serving as President of the World Bank Group since 2019. Malpass previously served as Under Secretary of the Treasury for International Affairs under Donald Trump, Deputy Assistant Treasury Secretary under Ronald Reagan, and Deputy Assistant Secretary of State under George H. W. Bush. He served as Chief Economist at Bear Stearns for the six years preceding its collapse.

During the 2016 U.S. presidential election, Malpass served as an economic advisor to Trump, and in 2017, he was nominated and confirmed as Under Secretary of the Treasury for International Affairs at the Treasury Department. Malpass was elected President of the World Bank on April 4, 2019, having been nominated to the position in February 2019 by the Trump administration. He formally took office on April 9, 2019, and announced in February 2023 that he was leaving the position in June 2023.

Education and career
Malpass earned a B.A. in physics at Colorado College and an MBA at the University of Denver. He studied international economics at Georgetown University's School of Foreign Service. He speaks Spanish, Russian, and French. From 1977 to 1983, he worked in Portland, Oregon for Esco Corporation and Arthur Andersen's systems consulting group, where he became a licensed CPA.

During the administrations of Ronald Reagan and George H. W. Bush, Malpass worked on an array of economic, budget, and foreign policy issues including small business promotion throughout Latin America and the 1986 tax cut. Malpass served as the Republican staff director of the United States Congress Joint Economic Committee from 1989 to 1990, and as a member of Congress's blue-ribbon panel on budget scoring from 2002 to 2003.

Malpass was chief economist at Bear Stearns from 1993 to 2008. As a result of the global financial crisis and under the prodding of the Federal Reserve and United States Department of the Treasury, Bear Sterns was sold to JPMorgan Chase in March 2008 for 6% of its value twelve months prior.

In June 2008, Malpass founded Encima Global, a New York City firm providing daily analysis of global economic and political trends relevant to institutional investors. In 2010, Malpass ran for the Republican nomination for United States Senate in that year's special election in New York. He placed second in the three-way primary with 38% of the vote after former Congressman Joe DioGuardi's 42%. In 2012, he wrote a chapter entitled 'Sound Money, Sound Policy' in The 4% Solution: Unleashing the Economic Growth America Needs, published by the George W. Bush Presidential Center.

Malpass writes a column for Forbes and is a contributor to the op-ed section of The Wall Street Journal. He is also a frequent television commentator.

Malpass sits on the boards of UBS Funds, the New Mountain Financial Corporation, and the Gary Klinsky Children's Center. He is also a former director of the National Committee on United States–China Relations, the Council of the Americas, and the Economic Club of New York, and a former member of the board of trustees of the Manhattan Institute.

Economic forecasts
Malpass has been noted for his forecasts before the financial crisis of 2007–2008 and in the time period following the Great Recession. In 2007, before the housing market collapse, Malpass wrote for The Wall Street Journal that "Housing and debt markets are not that big a part of the U.S. economy, or of job creation...the housing- and debt-market corrections will probably add to the length of the U.S. economic expansion." He also called for the raising of interest rates in 2011 at a time when others believed this would be harmful to the economy. Bruce Bartlett cited Malpass's 2008 forecast of economic growth and his 2012 forecast of recession as specific examples of partisan bias in economic forecasts.

Trump advisor
Malpass joined Donald Trump's presidential campaign in May 2016 as Senior Economic Advisor. He appeared frequently on television and radio to support Trump's message of faster growth through policy reforms. Four of his pre-election Forbes columns discussed the need for political upheaval to upend the status quo. On August 5, the campaign announced an economic round-table including Malpass. His September 1, 2016, The New York Times op-ed essay described fast growth through a policy upheaval covering taxes, trade, regulations and energy ("Why Our Economy Needs Trump"). Throughout the election time period, Malpass was heading the transition team's work on economic agencies including Treasury, Commerce, the Federal Reserve, USTR and independent regulatory agencies as Trump prepared to become president.

Under Secretary of the Treasury

In March 2017, the White House announced that Malpass would be President Trump's nominee for Under Secretary of the Treasury for International Affairs. Malpass was confirmed for the position by the United States Senate on August 3, 2017.

Malpass took a critical position on China during his tenure. He was described as "a champion of President Donald Trump's protectionist message."

World Bank President 
In February 2019, President Trump announced Malpass as the nominee for President of the World Bank, succeeding Jim Yong Kim, who had announced in January 2019 that he would be stepping down three years prior to the end of his five-year term in 2022. Malpass was unanimously approved by the executive board on April 5, 2019, and began his term on April 9.

During the start of his tenure, Malpass rarely mentioned climate change and was considered a supporter of Trump's environmental policies. After inauguration of Joe Biden in early 2021, American policy shifted towards prioritizing fighting climate change, and Malpass increasingly began working and speaking on climate policy. In April 2021, the World Bank released a five-year, 100 billion USD Climate Change Action Plan that would devote 35% of all financing to climate co-benefits, 50% of climate financing to climate change adaptation, and harmonize its financing goals with the Paris Agreement by 2023. The plan faced criticism that 35% was too low and that it did not move the World Bank towards fossil fuel divestment.

During the COVID-19 pandemic, Malpass won praise for supporting developing countries' recovery efforts and being able to quickly use World Bank financing. 

On September 20, 2022, former US Vice President and environmentalist Al Gore labelled Malpass a climate change denier and called for Biden to replace him during an event focusing on climate change hosted by The New York Times. Later during the event, Malpass was given an opportunity to respond to Gore and was asked three times if he accepted the scientific consensus on climate change that human fossil fuel consumption was a leading cause. Malpass did not answer, and said "I'm not a scientist." This answer prompted criticism from climate policy makers such as Rachel Kyte and Mark Carney, and calls for his resignation from the Rocky Mountain Institute and Christiana Figueres, among others. On September 21, the United States Department of the Treasury issued a statement that it expected World Bank leadership to take a leading role on climate issues. On September 22, Malpass said in both an internal memo to World Bank staff and on an interview with CNN International that he accepted the scientific consensus on human activity causing climate change and that he was not a "denier".

In mid-February 2023, Malpass announced his intention to end his term as president of the bank by June 2023.

Personal life
Malpass and his wife, Adele, daughter of Herman Obermayer and granddaughter of Neville Levy, live in New York City. Adele Malpass was appointed as the Chairwoman of the Manhattan Republican Party in January 2015 and was elected to a two-year term in September 2015. She was succeeded in the role by Andrea Catsimatidis after resigning to move to Washington when Malpass was appointed to his role in the Treasury Department under President Trump. , Adele Malpass was the president of The Daily Caller News Foundation, a non-profit organization linked with the eponymous news organization.

Malpass is a native of northern Michigan. He has four children.

References

External links
 What Will Donald Trump Do on Economic Policy? Here's a Top Adviser's View 

 Encima Global
 Malpass First on the Air in Senate Race
 David Malpass Runs for Senate

|-

1956 births
Living people
Colorado College alumni
Walsh School of Foreign Service alumni
George H. W. Bush administration personnel
New York (state) Republicans
Reagan administration personnel
The Wall Street Journal people
Trump administration personnel
United States Department of the Treasury officials
University of Denver alumni
Presidents of the World Bank Group